Four Mansions were four elaborate Chinese-style mansions built by four Teochew businessmen in the late 19th century in Singapore.

The mansions are as follows:
House of Tan Seng Poh (1869). It was located at the junction of Loke Yew Street and Hill Street, diagonally opposite the House of Wee Ah Hood.
House of Seah Eu Chin (1872). Located along North Boat Quay, the site is currently the field in front of Parliament House.
House of Wee Ah Hood (1878). The Singapore Chinese Chamber of Commerce and Industry bought over the mansion soon after it was formed and remains on the site since then. However, it was replaced by a new building in 1961.
House of Tan Yeok Nee (1885). Declared as a national monument in 1974, it is the most elaborate and the only surviving one of the "Four Great Mansions"

References 

Houses in Singapore
Teochew culture in Singapore